4th Ward may refer to:

Old Fourth Ward, a neighborhood on the East side of Atlanta 
Fourth Ward, Charlotte, a ward of Charlotte, North Carolina
4th ward, Chicago, an aldermanic ward of Chicago
Fourth Ward, Houston, a neighborhood of Houston
4th Ward of New Orleans, a ward of New Orleans
4th Ward, New York, a ward of New York City
Ward 4, St. Louis City, an aldermanic ward of St. Louis
Ward 4, one of the city subdivisions for neighborhoods of Washington, D.C.
Ward 4, the name of several wards of Zimbabwe
Kanata North Ward, Ottawa (also known as Ward 4)